In Our Lifetime may refer to:

In Our Lifetime (Marvin Gaye album), 1981
"In Our Lifetime" (Marvin Gaye song)
In Our Lifetime (Dave Douglas album), 1995
In Our Lifetime (Eightball & MJG album), 1999
"In Our Lifetime" (Texas song)